Nicomachus of Thebes (fl. 4th century BC) was an ancient Greek painter, a native of Thebes, and a contemporary of the great painters of the Classical period.  He trained under his father Aristides, also a painter.

Pliny gives a list of his works; among them a Rape of Proserpina, Victory in a Quadriga, Apollo and Diana, and Cybele seated on a Lion. Many of his works were taken to Rome. Pliny tells us that he was a very rapid worker and claims that he was one of the painters who used only four colors. Plutarch mentions his paintings as possessing the Homeric merit of ease and absence of effort.  Cicero equally praises his works.  Vitruvius observes that if his fame was less than his contemporaries, it was the fault of fortune rather than a lack of talent.

Among his students were his young brother Ariston, his son Aristides of Thebes, and Philoxenus of Eretria.

List of works 

 Rape of Proserpina (located in the Temple of Jupiter Optimus Maximus, in the cella of Minerva)
 Victory in a Quadriga (located in the Temple of Jupiter Optimus Maximus)
 Ulysses
 Apollo and Diana
 Cybele seated on a Lion
 Bacchantes and Satyrs
 Scylla (located in the Temple of Peace, Rome)
 Monument to Telestis (originally in Sicyon)

References

Sources
Marcus Tullius Cicero, Brutus.
Gaius Plinius Secundus (Pliny the Elder), Historia Naturalis (Natural History).
Lucius Mestrius Plutarchus (Plutarch), Lives of the Noble Greeks and Romans.

Michael Crawford, Roman Republican Coinage, Cambridge University Press (1974, 2001).

Ancient Greek painters
Ancient Thebans
Art of ancient Boeotia
4th-century BC Greek people
4th-century BC births
Year of death unknown
4th-century BC painters